Muirchertach (modern spelling: Muircheartach, anglicised as Murtagh) is an Irish language male given name meaning "mariner". The name was sometimes Anglicised as "Mortimer." The Old Norse name Kjartan is derived from this name. Muirchertach was borne by several figures from legend and history, including:

Muirchertach mac Ercae, great-grandson of Niall of the Nine Hostages and High King of Ireland
Muirchertach mac Néill, 10th-century king of Cenél nEógain
Muircheartach Ua Briain, 12th-century High King of Ireland
Muirchertach Mac Lochlainn, 12th-century king of Cenél nEógain
Muirchertach mac Maelruanaidh Mor, obscure king of Moylurg

See also
List of Irish-language given names

References 

Irish-language masculine given names